Tom Clancy's The Division Resurgence is a free-to-play multiplayer third-person shooter mobile game under development by Ubisoft. It will take place in the same world as Tom Clancy's The Division and Tom Clancy's The Division 2, though will have a story independent of the two games. Announced with a trailer on 7 July 2022, the game will be released for iOS and Android devices.

References

External links 

Tom Clancy games
Upcoming video games